David Malcolm Bielkus (born 22 March 1945) is a Scottish former professional football defender. He played in England and the Netherlands for Arsenal, Millwall, Cheltenham Town, Telstar, Ashford Town (Kent), and Tonbridge Angels. He also went on to manage English non-league club Ringmer.

References

External links
 

Living people
1945 births
Footballers from Glasgow
Association football defenders
Scottish footballers
Scottish football managers
Arsenal F.C. players
Millwall F.C. players
Cheltenham Town F.C. players
SC Telstar players
Ashford United F.C. players
Tonbridge Angels F.C. players
Eerste Divisie players
Eredivisie players
Scottish expatriate footballers
Scottish expatriate sportspeople in the Netherlands
Expatriate footballers in the Netherlands